"Come Again" is a song recorded by Japanese hip-hop trio M-Flo for their second studio album Expo Expo (2001). It was released as their 9th physical single through Rhythm Zone on January 17, 2001. Serving as the second single for the album following "How You Like Me Now?", the release contains two additional remix tracks as well as its instrumental version.

"Come Again" experienced commercial success in Japan upon its release, where it peaked at number four on the Oricon Singles Chart and sold nearly 390,000 copies by the end of the year. It was certified twice in platinum by the Recording Industry Association of Japan (RIAJ) in both digital sales and physical shipments. In 2012, "Come Again" attained a new Billboard Japan Hot 100 peak of number 61.

Track listing  

 CD single

 "Come Again" — 5:54
 "Come Again (Yukihiro Fukutomi remix)" — 8:00
 "Come Again (Jark Prongo remix)" — 7:44
 "Come Again (Instrumental)" — 5:53

Charts

Weekly charts

Yearly charts

Sales and certifications

Release history

References 

M-Flo songs
2001 singles
2001 songs